Japanese names on the moon craters

 Asada (crater)
 Hatanaka (crater)
 Hirayama (crater)
 Murakami (crater)
 Nagaoka (crater)
 Naonobu (crater)
 Yamamoto (crater)
 Nishina (crater)
 Kimura (crater)
 Onizuka (crater)

External links 
 http://www.rediscovery.co.jp/?p=2642

Space program of Japan
 space